Aviapark is a six-storey shopping centre in the Khoroshyovsky District of Moscow, Russia. With a total area of 390,000 square metres and 230,000 square metres of leasable space, it is the first largest shopping mall in Europe.
It opened in November 2014 with more than 500 shops and a four-story aquarium that extends to the ceiling of the retail section.

Location
The property is in the Khoroshyovsky District of Moscow, on the grounds of the former Khodynka Aerodrome. There is direct access to the centre on the Moscow Metro: The distance between the metro station CSKA and the shopping centre can be covered in a few minutes on foot.

Development and Ownership
The property was developed by AMMA Development, which was founded by Mikhail Zaits. The only major shareholder is Mikhail Zaits.

In 2017, media reports suggested that Gazprombank was, at one point, involved in the mall's ownership. The bank initially provided a $560 million construction loan on the mall. Kommersant reported that, as part of a restructuring, Aviapark Mall Holdings received an option to buy the remaining stake from Gazprombank, which it exercised, removing the bank from the ownership structure.

It received its GPZU, or approved development plan, in June 2012 and began construction later that year. The opening was projected for the fourth quarter of 2014. Jones Lang LaSalle was named as the property's leasing agent.

Major Retailers
The mall's anchors include French retailer Auchan, the home improvement chain OBI, IKEA, Stockmann, Sephora and H&M. Karo, a Russian cinema chain, operates a 17-screen multiplex, one of the largest in Russia.

Gallery

References

External links
Official website

Shopping malls in Russia
Buildings and structures in Moscow
Shopping malls established in 2014
2014 establishments in Russia